Conostephium magnum is a species of flowering plant in the family Ericaceae and is endemic to the south-west of Western Australia. It is an erect, compact shrub with scattered lance-shaped leaves with the narrower end toward the base, and pendulous, spindle-shaped, cream-coloured to white and pink flowers arranged singly in leaf axils.

Description
The leaves are glabrous and the edges are often rolled inwards.

Taxonomy and naming
Conostephium magnum was first formally described in 2002 by Raymond Jeffrey Cranfield in the journal Nuytsia from specimens collected near the Tiwest Cooljarloo mine site in 1993. The specific epithet (magnum) means "large", referring to the height of the species.

Distribution and habitat
Conostephium magnum grows on sand dunes, disturbed roadsides and in swamp and open woodland, mainly from Cataby to near Gingin in the Geraldton Sandplains and Swan Coastal Plain bioregions of south-western Western Australia.

Conservation status
This conostephium is listed as "Priority Four" by the Government of Western Australia Department of Biodiversity, Conservation and Attractions, meaning that it is rare or near threatened.

References

magnum
Epacridoideae
Eudicots of Western Australia
Ericales of Australia
Endemic flora of Western Australia
Plants described in 2002